Ipoh is the capital city of the Malaysian state of Perak. , Ipoh had a population of 657,892, making it the fourth largest city in Malaysia by population.

Originally a village, Ipoh began to grow rapidly in the 1880s after huge deposits of tin were discovered within its vicinity. By 1895, it was the second largest town within the Federated Malay States, which also consisted of Selangor, Negeri Sembilan and Pahang. Ipoh was declared a city in 1988. However, following the depletion of its tin deposits and the collapse of tin prices in the 1970s, the city suffered decades of decline and neglect.

In recent years, Ipoh's popularity as an international tourist destination has been significantly boosted by efforts to conserve its British colonial-era architecture. The city is also well known for its cuisine and natural attractions, such as its limestone hills and caves within which Buddhist temples were built. In addition, Ipoh has managed to maintain its reputation as one of the cleanest cities in Malaysia and Asia in general.

Ipoh's location between Kuala Lumpur and George Town has made it a major land transportation hub within West Malaysia, with both the Malayan Railway's West Coast Line and the North-South Expressway cutting through the city. Aside from the land transportation links, Ipoh is also served by the Sultan Azlan Shah Airport.

Etymology
The name Ipoh is derived from a local tree, pohon epu, now more commonly known as pokok ipoh. The sap of this plant is poisonous and was used by local indigenous people mixed with Strychnos latex to coat the tips of their blowpipe darts for hunting.

History
Ipoh grew out from the Malay village of Paloh along the banks of the Kinta River in the 1880s. Its geographic location in the rich tin-bearing valley of the Kinta River made it a natural centre of growth.

The Great Fire of Ipoh in 1892 destroyed over half the town, but also presented an opportunity to rebuild the town in a more orderly grid pattern. Ipoh was subsequently rebuilt in time for the second tin rush and grew rapidly as a result of the booming tin mining industry, particularly in the 1920s and 1930s.

A local Hakka miner, millionaire Yau Tet Shin, started developing a large tract of the town in the early 1930s, today known as the "New Town", from the eastern bank of the Kinta River to Greentown. In 1937, Ipoh was made the capital of Perak, replacing Taiping.

Ipoh was invaded by the Japanese on 15 December 1941. In March 1942, the Japanese Civil Administration or Perak Shu Seicho was set up at St. Michael's Institution. After the liberation of Malaya by British forces, Ipoh remained the capital of Perak as it does to this day.

The decline of the tin mining industry during the latter half of the 20th century caused the growth of Ipoh to stagnate. With the closure of the tin mines, its urban population was forced to seek employment in other cities within Malaysia. In spite of this, Ipoh remains one of the largest cities in Malaysia in terms of population, with tourism now a main driver of the city's economy.

Ipoh gained Municipal status in 1962, and in 1988 it was declared a city by the then Sultan of Perak, Sultan Azlan Shah.

Geography

Topography
Ipoh is in the state of Perak, which is in the central part of Peninsular Malaysia. The city is in the middle of the karstic Kinta Valley region, on the bank of the Kinta River and the confluence of the smaller rivers Sungai Pinji and Sungai Pari. Hills of limestone, called mogotes, surround the city, which can be found around suburban areas to the northeast, east and southeast.

The Keledang mountain range stretches from the north to the west of the city. This range runs parallel to the Bintang mountain range with the Perak River running on its left bank and the Kinta River to its right. This range is interrupted to the north of Ipoh by a tributary of the Perak River called the Pelus River, which is sourced from the Titiwangsa mountain range, which runs to the east of Ipoh.

Climate
Ipoh has a tropical rainforest climate. Ipoh is more subject to the Intertropical Convergence Zone than the trade winds and very rarely has cyclones, therefore it can be described as having an equatorial climate. The city's temperature shows little variation throughout the year, the average temperature being . The wettest month is October when on average  of rain falls. Ipoh's driest month is January which has  of rainfall on average.

Limestone caves
Mogotes are the most prominent natural features of the city. There are many caves in these outcrops, some of which have cave temples built in them. The Sam Poh Tong Temple  is a notable example, along with Kek Lok Tong ; Cavern of Utmost Happiness), which lies on the other side of the same outcrop. It is accessible through the Gunung Rapat housing area. Other cave temples in Ipoh include Ling Sen Tong, Nan Tian Tong, Kwan Yin Tong and Perak Tong.

Gua Tempurung, near Gopeng, south of Ipoh, is a show cave open to the public and popular among spelunkers. Part of it has been developed with electric lighting and walkways, and there are tours of varying lengths and difficulty. A river passage runs about  through the hill. There are five large chambers, filled with spectacular speleothems which include stalactites and stalagmites.

Economy
Ipoh was once one of the richest cities in Malaysia and South East Asia in the days when tin was its major product. During the 1980s, when tin prices collapsed, the economy of Ipoh was affected significantly. However, recently the city has experienced economic growth. The city of Ipoh also hosts some large multinational corporations. Kuala Lumpur Kepong Berhad, a palm oil company among the top 15 biggest companies in Malaysia by revenue, has its headquarters in Ipoh. Batu Kawan Berhad, an investment company which is the biggest shareholder in Kuala Lumpur Kepong Berhad, also has its headquarters in Malaysia. Ipoh houses the headquarters of Hovid Berhad, a pharmaceutical company which claims to be the first Malaysian company to introduce Malaysian generic drugs overseas. Old Town Berhad, which is a food and beverage public listed company specializing in white coffee, has its headquarters in Ipoh. There are other public listed companies in Ipoh such as Perak Transit Berhad, Tasek Cement Berhad, DKLS Industries Berhad, Wellcall Holding Berhad, Rubberex Berhad, and Perak Corp. Ipoh also hosts the Malaysian headquarters for some foreign multinational companies, including Finisar, Voith, ITL Asia Pacific and Sagami Manufacturers.

Governance

The Ipoh City Council governs the city. Datuk Rumaizi Baharin, appointed in April 2020, is the current mayor of Ipoh.

Ipoh is divided into two parliamentary constituencies: Ipoh Barat (Ipoh West) and Ipoh Timor (Ipoh East). The parliamentary seat for Ipoh Barat is held by Democratic Action Party (DAP) Representative M. Kulasegaran. The seat for Ipoh Timor is held by fellow DAP leader Howard Lee Chuan How. As of 2022, there were 233,000 voters in Ipoh. Most of the voters in Ipoh are Chinese, followed by Malays, Indians and others.

Demographics
Ipoh remains one of Malaysia's largest cities. As of 2010, the municipal area of Ipoh has a population of 657,892. It ranks as the seventh most populous urban centre in Malaysia (2010).

The following is based on Department of Statistics Malaysia 2010 census.

Cityscape

The Old Town
The Old Town lies to the west of the Kinta River. It has a commercial district with many historical "shop-houses" centred around Leech Street; now Jalan Bandar Timah). Other notable features include:

Ipoh railway station in neo-classical/Edwardian Baroque style nicknamed the "Taj Mahal of Ipoh".
Ipoh Town Hall, an Edwardian Baroque municipal building located across the road from the Railway Station.
Padang Ipoh or Ipoh Field, on Jalan S.P. Seenivasagam. The field is surrounded by historic buildings that feature classic colonial architecture, including the mock-Tudor style Ipoh Club, FMS Bar, HSBC Building and the St Michael's Institution secondary school.
The Anglo-Chinese School, Ipoh, officially named SMK Methodist (ACS), is located along Lahat Road.
Sekolah Menengah Kebangsaan Convent Ipoh, also known as Main Convent Ipoh is almost 114 years. Established in 1907, one of the oldest all girls school in Ipoh.
Sekolah Menengah Kebangsaan Anderson is the most well-known secondary school with more than 100 years of history, located beside the General Hospital of Ipoh.
St. Michael's Institution, Ipoh is a public secondary school situated on Jalan S. P. Seenivasagam, formerly Clayton Road.
Han Chin Pet Soo, the Hakka Tin Miner's Club, located on Jalan Bijeh Timah (formerly Treacher Street) has been restored and turned into Malaysia's First Hakka Tin Mining Museum.
Muzium Darul Ridzuan is a historical museum of Perak, in a former tin-mining tycoon's mansion on Jalan Kuala Kangsar.
Concubine Lane, or better known locally as Yi Lai Hong in Cantonese, is a narrow and small lane located off Jalan Bandar Timah (Leech Street) in Old Town. It now has restaurants, souvenir and gift shops and a reputable hotel.
Ipoh wall art murals, drawn by talented street art artists, are now a tourist attraction.
Birch Memorial Clock Tower is a historical landmark which is located near the Ipoh State Mosque or commonly known as Sultan Idris Shah II Mosque. The clock tower was built to commemorate James W. W. Birch, the first British Resident in Perak who was killed on 2 November 1875 at Pasir Salak.

The New Town
The so-called New Town, to the east of the Kinta River, was developed by Yau Tet Shin around 1908. The New Town houses the Perak Medical University, Bangunan Sri Kinta, Ipoh Parade, Ipoh City Hall building. There are numerous shops, shopping malls, and hotels.

D. R. Seenivasagam Park (Coronation Park), located in the heart of Ipoh's New Town, is known for its scenery and recreational facilities. It comprises recreational fields, an artificial lake filled with fish, a nursery for potted plants and a children's traffic playground. The latest addition is the newly landscaped Japanese garden featuring a Japanese carp pond.

Culture

Cuisine

Ipoh has a significant food scene with many hawker centres and restaurants. It has dishes derived from Malay, Chinese and Indian cuisine. 

Little India  in the city of Ipoh is famous for its Indian cuisine. Banana leaf rice, Nasi Kandar and Chapati are some of the famous dishes eaten in this area. Apart from that, Ipoh is also famous for its Kacang Puthih. Kampung Kacang Putih is about 20 minutes drive from Ipoh town. Here, you can find many shops and stalls selling several versions of the crunchy snack, as well as chips, murukku and other delicious treats. Mixed muruku, pakodas, sivels, dal, aulu, poori, sri lanka pakodas, omom, kadai, kacang kacang and sweet potato chips are among the 50 types of white beans that can be found in any shop you visit if you visit the village. There are also which sells sweets such as laddu, jalebi and athirasam . People say the best white beans come from Kampung Kacang Putih in Buntong, Perak.

Other famous indian food is Nasi Kandar Vangey, Nasi Kandar Ganja and Ipoh town Cendol. 

Sar Hor Fun , a complete one-dish rice noodle meal with prawn, meat, fish, vegetables and a savoury sauce. Other well-known dishes from Ipoh include Hor Hee , flat white rice noodles served with fish cakes and/or fish balls; Nga Choi Kai , chicken with soy sauce and beansprouts topped with pepper; Kai Shi Hor Fun , rice noodles with chicken; Hakka Mee , yellow rice noodles served with mincemeat (pork) sauce; Tau Fu Fa, soybean pudding; and Ipoh's well-known pastry Heong Peng , literally translated to "fragrant biscuit". The city is known in Malaysia for its Ipoh white coffee, in which the coffee beans are roasted with palm-oil margarine and the resulting coffee is served with condensed milk. Ipoh is also known for its fresh fruits such as pomelo, durian and seedless guava. 

In recent years, Ipoh has seen an increase in international restaurants, bars and gastropubs which have become popular with locals and tourists.

Film and television
Movies filmed in Ipoh include:
 1992: Indochine
 1999: Anna and the King
 2003: Kadhal Kisu Kisu
 2005: Sepet
 2005: Gubra
 2006: After This Our Exile 
 2006: Goodbye Boys
 2006: Lust, Caution 
 2015: Blackhat

Greenery & Public Parks
 D. R. Seenivasagam Park (Coronation Park)
 Sultan Abdul Aziz Recreational Park (Polo Ground)
 Kledang Saiong Forest Eco Park
 Botani Eco Park

Theme parks
There are several theme parks in Ipoh, including the Sunway Lost World of Tambun and the now defunct Movies Animated Park Studios (MAPS).

Transport

 Trunk roads: The old interstate Federal Route 1 connects Ipoh with other major towns and cities in peninsular Malaysia, for example to Alor Setar, Taiping and Penang to the north and Tapah, Kuala Lumpur, Seremban and even Johor Bahru in the south. Motorists from the east coast can use Federal Route 4 (from Gerik) in northern Perak or Federal Route 185 (from Cameron Highlands).
 Highway: The new North–South Expressway is a faster and more efficient alternative to Route 1. However, some towns such as Kampar can only be accessible via Route 1.
 Train: Ipoh's railway station is operated by Keretapi Tanah Melayu (KTM) and is in the Old Town. However, it does not have intra-city travel like there is in Kuala Lumpur; the railway only connects Ipoh with neighbouring towns and cities. The station is a stately building, referred to by locals as the "Taj Mahal of Ipoh". There are 10 dedicated shuttle train services between these two cities daily, beginning at 5 am from both of the stations. Travel time between the cities was expected to be reduced from three hours to two hours and fifteen minutes when the new set of EMU trains arrived in mid-2009.
 Bus: The inter-city bus terminal is located at Amanjaya Integrated Bus Terminal in Bandar Meru Raya, just north of the city. Medan Kitt is the public transport intracity terminal that is very near to Ipoh Railway Station. Currently, the main piblic transport operator in the city is PerakTransit under the branding of myBAS Ipoh.
 Air:  the Sultan Azlan Shah Airport is the only airport in Ipoh, located near Gunung Rapat. Domestic and international flights are available. Scoot and AirAsia provide daily flights from Ipoh to Singapore Changi Airport while Batik Air Malaysia used to provide daily flights to Senai International Airport, serving as a link to the city of Johor Bahru. There are also planned flights to Indonesia, Singapore, Thailand and China, with talks of a new airport soon.

Education

This is a list of schools in Ipoh, Perak.
Sekolah Izzuddin Shah 
Sekolah Tuanku Abdul Rahman 
Sekolah Menengah Kebangsaan Tanjung Rambutan
Sekolah Menengah Kebangsaan Seri Puteri
Sekolah Jenis Kebangsaan (T) St. Philomena Convent, Ipoh
Sekolah Kebangsaan Dato Panglima'Kinta, Ipoh
Sekolah Jenis Kebangsaan (C) Yuk Choy, Ipoh 
SMJK Yuk Choy, Ipoh 
Tarcisian Convent School, Ipoh (TCS)
Anderson School, Ipoh
Anglo-Chinese School, Ipoh
St. Michael's Institution, Ipoh
SMK Jalan Tasek, Ipoh 
Methodist Girls Secondary School (MGS), Ipoh
Perak Girls Secondary School (PGS), Ipoh
SMK Main Convent, Ipoh
Wesley Methodist School, Ipoh
Ipoh International School (Private)
Fairview International School, Ipoh
Perak Yuk Choy High School (Private), Ipoh 
Poi Lam High School (Private), Ipoh 
Shen Jai High School (Private), Ipoh
Sekolah Jenis Kebangsaan (T) Kerajaan, Sungai Pari, Ipoh
Sekolah Jenis Kebangsaan (T) Gunung Rapat, Ipoh
Sekolah Jenis Kebangsaan (T) Perak Sangeetha Sabha, Ipoh
SMK Rapat Setia, Ipoh
SMK Jalan Pasir Puteh, Ipoh
Sekolah Jenis Kebangsaan (C) Poi Lam, Ipoh
SMK Seri Keledang, Ipoh
SMK Menglembu, Ipoh
SMJK Poi Lam, Ipoh
Sekolah Jenis Kebangsaan (C) Sam Tet, Ipoh 
SMJK Sam Tet, Ipoh
SMK Dato Ahmad Said
Sekolah Jenis Kebangsaan Ave Maria Convent, Ipoh 
SMJK Ave Maria Convent, Ipoh 
Sekolah Jenis Kebangsaan (C) Gunung Rapat, Ipoh
Sekolah Jenis Kebangsaan (C) Wan Hwa (1) 
Sekolah Jenis Kebangsaan (C) Wan Hwa (2) 
Sekolah Kebangsaan (ACS), Ipoh
Sekolah Kebangsaan (P) Methodist, Ipoh
Sekolah Kebangsaan Haji Mahmud Chemor, Ipoh
Sekolah Kebangsaan Kuala Pari, Ipoh
Sekolah Kebangsaan Jalan Pegoh
Sekolah Kebangsaan Jelapang
Sekolah Kebangsaan Marian Convent, Ipoh
Sekolah Kebangsaan Raja Ekram, Ipoh
SMK Raja Perempuan, Ipoh (RPS) Royal Princess School "Cluster School"
SRK Raja Perempuan, Ipoh (RPS) 
Sekolah Kebangsaan Seri Ampang, Ipoh
Sekolah Kebangsaan St. Michael's Institution (1), Ipoh
Sekolah Kebangsaan St. Michael's Institution (2), Ipoh
Sekolah Jenis Kebangsaan (C) Chung Shan

Sports

Ipoh has a sports complex known as Kompleks Sukan MBI or MBI Sports Complex. Among the facilities located within the complex is the Perak Stadium, the home of Perak Football Association who play in the Malaysia Super League.

Golf courses in Ipoh include the Royal Perak Golf Club off Jalan Sultan Azlan Shah (Tiger Lane), the Meru Golf Club in Jelapang, and Clearwater Sanctuary Golf Club en route to Batu Gajah.

Other sports venues include the Kilat Club in Pasir Pinji, Ipoh Field (Padang Ipoh) in the Old Town, the Polo Grounds, and the Iskandar Polo Club in Ampang Baru.

The Sultan Azlan Shah Cup is an annual international men's field hockey tournament held in Ipoh.

Notable people

Film and television
 Angie Cheong, actress
 Mimi Chu, actress and singer
 Iqram Dinzly, actor and model
 Mamat Khalid, film director and screenwriter
 Peter Pek, TV host and businessman
 Afdlin Shauki, screenwriter, director and actor
 Patrick Teoh, actor and radio host
 Michelle Yeoh, actress famous for role in Crouching Tiger, Hidden Dragon
 Natasha Hudson, actress and model
 Mandy Lieu, actress and model

Music
 Michael Wong, singer-songwriter
 Jamal Abdillah, pop singer and actor
 Shila Amzah, singer-songwriter and actress
 Ning Baizura, pop and R&B singer, actress
 Francissca Peter, singer-songwriter
 Sophia Liana
 Sam Chin Neng of pop duo Fuying & Sam

Sports (badminton)
 Koo Kien Keat
 Choong Tan Fook
 Lee Wan Wah
 Cheah Soon Kit
 Wong Pei Tty
 Wong Mew Choo

Sports (football)
 Nazirul Naim
 Chan Kok Heng
 Muhamad Khalid Jamlus
 Azizon Abdul Kadir

Sports (others)
 Tony Underwood (rugby)
 Nur Suryani Mohd Taibi (sports shooting)
 Leong Mun Yee (diving)
 Cheong Jun Hoong (diving)
 Cindy Ong Pik Yin (competitive swimming)

Business
 David Ho Sue San of Hovid Berhad and Carotech Berhad
 Lee Loy Seng, founder of Kuala Lumpur Kepong Berhad
 Dr. Wong Jeh Shyan, CEO of CommerceNet Singapore Limited
 Koon Yew Yin, founder of IJM Corporation Bhd and Gamuda Berhad
 Leong Sin Nam, tin mine owner
 Eu Tong Sen, tin mine owner
 Foo Choo Choon, tin mine owner who has a road in Ipoh named after him
 Chung Thye Phin, tin mine owner who has a road in Ipoh named after him
 Leong Fee, tin mine owner

Politics
 Yeoh Ghim Seng, Speaker of the Parliament of Singapore 1970–1989
 Dr Yeoh Eng Kiong, Hong Kong Secretary for Health, Welfare and Food 2002–2004
 S. J. V. Chelvanayakam, Member of the Ceylonese Parliament 1956–1977
 Ahmad Husni Hanadzlah, Second Minister of Finance of Malaysia 2009–2016
 D. R. Seenivasagam, co-founder of the People's Progressive Party
 Lim Keng Yaik, president of the Malaysian People's Movement Party 1980–2007
 Lee Lam Thye, social activist and former politician
 Chang Lih Kang, Malaysian politician
 Lee Chuan How, Member of the Perak State Executive Council 2018–2020
 Yusof bin Ishak, president of Singapore 1965–1970

Other
 Chan Sek Keong, Chief Justice of Singapore 2006–2012
 Lat, cartoonist
 Huen Su Yin, blogger and cake designer
 Tang Siew Mun, academic
 Tang Tuck Kan, artist
 Wu Lien-teh, physician during the Manchurian Plague

Sister cities

Ipoh currently has two sister cities:

  Nanning, China.
  Fukuoka, Japan.

See also
 List of roads in Ipoh
 List of Ipoh areas
Jalan Ipoh MRT station
Jalan Ipoh - a road in Kuala Lumpur named after Ipoh

References

External links

  Ipoh Tourism Board Official Website
 Ipoh City Guide Website

 
Populated places in Perak
Populated places established in 1880